Hamirpur may refer to:

Himachal Pradesh
 Hamirpur, Himachal Pradesh, India
 Hamirpur district, Himachal Pradesh, district of the above town
 Hamirpur, Himachal Pradesh Lok Sabha constituency
 Hamirpur (Himachal Pradesh Vidhan Sabha constituency)

Uttar Pradesh
 Hamirpur, Uttar Pradesh, India
 Hamirpur district, Uttar Pradesh
 Hamirpur (Uttar Pradesh Lok Sabha constituency)
 Hamirpur (Uttar Pradesh Assembly constituency)

West Bengal
 Hamirpur, a village in Ramnagar II community development block, Purba Medinipur district

See also
Hamir (disambiguation)
Hammira (disambiguation)